Alfonso Gagliano   (25 January 1942 – 12 December 2020) was a Canadian accountant and politician.

Early life and family
Born in Siculiana, Italy, Gagliano immigrated to Montreal in 1958. His political career began in 1977 when he ran for a seat on the then Jérôme-LeRoyer school board, which no longer exists and used to cover the East End of Montreal Island.

In 1965, Gagliano married Ersilia Gidaro and with her bore three children; Vincenzo, Maria and Immacolata.

Political career
In the 1984 federal election, he ran for Parliament for Saint-Léonard—Anjou narrowly defeating the Progressive Conservative candidate. It was one of the few ridings that the Liberals retained, as they were swept out of power in a massive Conservative landslide. He was re-elected in the 1988 and 1993 elections representing Saint-Léonard, and in the 1997 and 2000 elections representing Saint-Léonard—Saint-Michel.

From 1996 to 2002, he served in various cabinet posts including Minister of Labour, Deputy House leader and the Minister responsible for Communications Canada, Canada Post, the Canada Mortgage and Housing Corporation, the Royal Canadian Mint and Canada Lands Company Ltd.  His most controversial positions were as Minister of Public Works and Government Services and as political minister for Quebec.

Following his career as a cabinet minister, Gagliano was appointed as the Canadian ambassador to Denmark after having been rejected by the Vatican for a similar posting. However, he was dismissed from this position on February 10, 2004 by Governor General Adrienne Clarkson, on the advice of Foreign Affairs Minister Bill Graham, amidst widespread speculation that during his time as public works minister he was actively involved in the sponsorship scandal.

Aftermath
On May 27, 2004, Gagliano filed a more than $4.5-million lawsuit against Prime Minister Paul Martin and the government. The suit accused the defendants of deliberately attacking Gagliano's reputation and alleged that he was illegally and unjustly fired. He sought compensation for wrongful dismissal, damage to his reputation and lost income. The lawsuit was eventually dismissed.

Justice John Gomery's initial report on the sponsorship scandal places much of the blame on Gagliano, making him the highest ranking Liberal to be charged with deliberate dishonesty, rather than negligence. Following the initial report, Paul Martin expelled him from the Liberal Party for life.

On November 17, 2004, an article in the New York Daily News alleged that Gagliano was associated with the Bonanno crime family of New York City. In the article, former capo Frank Lino, turned informant for the U.S. Federal Bureau of Investigation, is quoted as saying Gagliano was first introduced to him during a meeting with other mob members in Montreal in the early 1990s. Lino also stated that Gagliano was a made man of the Mafia. It was not the first time Gagliano's name has been linked to organized crime. In April 1994, La Presse reported that Gagliano was the accountant for Agostino Cuntrera, cousin of cocaine baron Alfonso Caruana, also a native of Siculiana, who was convicted in the gangland slaying of Paolo Violi in Montreal in 1978. Gagliano denied any links to the Mafia. Since August 2008, Gagliano resided with his family on a vineyard in Dunham, Quebec he purchased.

In September 2006, he argued that Liberal leadership candidate Joe Volpe was the victim of the same kind of anti-Italian sentiment that ended his own political career.

Electoral record (partial)

References

The Rothschilds of the Mafia on Aruba, by Tom Blickman, Transnational Organized Crime, Vol. 3, No. 2, Summer 1997
'They have to stop dirtying my name,' says Gagliano The Hill Times, November 22, 2004

External links
 

1942 births
2020 deaths
People from Saint-Leonard, Quebec
Politicians from Montreal
Italian emigrants to Canada
Liberal Party of Canada MPs
Members of the 26th Canadian Ministry
Members of the House of Commons of Canada from Quebec
Members of the King's Privy Council for Canada
Canadian accountants
Ambassadors of Canada to Denmark
Corruption in Canada
Ministers of Labour of Canada
Bonanno crime family
People from Siculiana